Luisa Cagi Tamanitoakula (born 28 July 1998) is a Fijian footballer who plays as a midfielder for Ba FC and the Fiji women's national team. She was captain of the under-20 team at the 2019 Oceania Women Under-19 Championship.

In August 2018 she was named to the Fijian team for the 2018 OFC Women's Nations Cup.

Notes

References

1998 births
Living people
Women's association football midfielders
Fijian women's footballers
Fiji women's international footballers